Dave Specter (born May 21, 1963) is an American Chicago blues and jazz guitarist.

Biography
Hailing from Chicago's Northwest side, Specter began to learn to play the guitar at the age of 18. His teacher was Steve Freund, who taught Specter between the latter's duties at the Jazz Record Mart and Delmark Records. Freund ultimately organised a concert tour for Specter alongside Sam Lay and Hubert Sumlin. Contacts made while working at the B.L.U.E.S. nightclub secured gigs as a sideman to Johnny Littlejohn, Son Seals, and the Legendary Blues Band. By 1989 Specter had organized his own backing band, known as the Bluebirds.

By 1998 Specter had released five albums on the Delmark label, combining a mixture of blues (Specter listed his influences as T-Bone Walker, Pee Wee Crayton, Magic Sam, and Otis Rush) and jazz (Kenny Burrell is another inspiration).

Specter does not sing, and he enlisted Barkin' Bill Smith as his first vocalist, performing on Specter's 1991 debut album, Bluebird Blues. Specter then made a guest appearance with Jesse Fortune, providing accompaniment on Fortune Tellin' Man (1993). Harmonica player and singer Tad Robinson took over on the Bluebirds' Blueplicity (1994) and Live In Europe (1995). Following Robinson's departure, Lynwood Slim became the band's vocalist.

Jazz influences prevailed as time passed, and Specter invited Brother Jack McDuff to play the Hammond organ on the next album, Left Turn On Blue (1996). Lenny Lynn took over vocal duties on the following release, Blues Spoken Here (1998). In 2000, Speculatin''' appeared, but here Specter eschewed vocals altogether, issuing 13 instrumental tracks. Is What It Is with Steve Freund (2004) was followed by Live in Chicago (2008).

In addition to his recordings, Specter undertakes frequent tours to Europe and beyond.

Discography
 Bluebird Blues (Delmark DD-652, 1991) - with Barkin' Bill Smith, Ronnie Earl
 Fortune Tellin' Man - Jesse Fortune (Delmark DD-658, 1993) 
 Blueplicity (Delmark DD-664, 1994) - with Tad Robinson
 Live in Europe (Delmark DE-677, 1995) - with Tad Robinson
 Left Turn on Blue (Delmark DE-693, 1996) - with Lynwood Slim, Jack McDuff
 Blues Spoken Here (Delmark DE-721, 1998) - with Lenny Lynn, Eric Alexander
 Speculatin' (Delmark DE-744, 2000)
 Is What It Is (Delmark DE-779, 2004) - with Steve Freund
 Live in Chicago (Delmark DE-794, 2008) - with Jimmy Johnson, Tad Robinson, Sharon Lewis
 Spectified (Fret12 30021, 2010)
 Message in Blue (Delmark DE-836, 2014) - with Otis Clay
 Blues...from the Inside Out'' (Delmark DE-859, 2019) - with Jorma Kaukonen, Brother John Kattke

Legacy
Music journalist, Tony Russell wrote that "an extended, uncluttered view of Specter's music is noteworthy in his performance at a 1994 German  concert, in a quartet with the correspondingly idiomatic harmonica playing and soulful singing of Tad Robinson".

See also
 List of Chicago blues musicians
 List of electric blues musicians

References

1963 births
20th-century American guitarists
20th-century American male musicians
21st-century American Jews
American blues guitarists
American male guitarists
American male songwriters
Blues musicians from Illinois
Guitarists from Chicago
Jewish American musicians
Jewish jazz musicians
Living people
American male jazz musicians
Songwriters from Illinois